The TGV POS is a TGV train built by French manufacturer Alstom which is operated by the French national rail company, the SNCF, in France's high-speed rail lines. It was originally ordered by the SNCF for use on the new LGV Est, which was put into service in 2007. "POS" stands for Paris-Ostfrankreich-Süddeutschland (German for "Paris, Eastern France, Southern Germany").

History

The TGV Réseau power cars thus freed have been matched to newer TGV Duplex carriages to create TGV Réseau Duplex sets. This is because traffic on the LGV Est is expected to be less than on the heavily congested LGV Sud-Est.

Like the TGV TMST, the TGV POS power cars have asynchronous motors and, in case of failure, isolation of an individual motor in a powered bogie is possible. By using IGBT power packs, the new power cars are capable of developing 75% of their full rated power under 15 kV German and Swiss electrifications, compared to 45% for existing TGV power cars. This allows POS trains to operate at the same speed as Intercity-Express trains in Germany.

The TGV POS links France with Germany and Switzerland. In Switzerland, it travels from Basel to Zurich and on the line from Vallorbe to Lausanne coming from Paris.

Each TGV POS trainset weighs  and is numbered in the 4400 series. The livery is the same as that of TGV Réseau sets (silver and blue). Pre-production set No 4401 had a prototype livery similar as the one used on the TGV Duplex sets but, in March 2007, the blue areas were stickered over with silver and was now in appearance the same as the other sets.

From 2013 to 2019, all of the TGV POS trainsets operated under the TGV Lyria brand and livery (a joint-venture by SNCF and the Swiss Federal Railways) with services between France and Switzerland, replacing the nine TGV PSE trainsets that were taken out of service. Since 2019 all trainsets operate strictly in domestic services from Paris Nord and Paris Est replacing the last TGV PSE operating there.

World rail speed record

On 3 April 2007 a train using both power cars of the TGV POS trainset number 4402 set a new world speed record for travel on conventional rails. The train reached .

The trainset comprised three specially modified Duplex cars, fitted with two powered bogies similar to the AGV prototype, marshalled between the TGV POS power cars. Over 600 sensors were fitted on various parts of both the engines and the cars.

The train set ran with larger wheels, and the catenary voltage was increased to 31 kV from the standard 25 kV. The maximum speed was achieved near kilometer post 193 on the LGV Est between Meuse and Champagne-Ardenne TGV stations.

See also
  
ICE 3
TGV Duplex
 SNCF TGV Thalys PBKA
 List of high-speed trains

References

Pos
Passenger trains running at least at 300 km/h in commercial operations
Electric multiple units with locomotive-like power cars
15 kV AC multiple units
25 kV AC multiple units
Alstom multiple units